Marquis Xiao may refer to:

Marquis Xiao of Jin (died 724 BC)
Cui Lin (died 245), Cao Wei politician, posthumous name Marquis Xiao

See also
Marquis Xiaozi of Jin (died 705 BC)